Crambus perspicuus is a moth in the family Crambidae. It was described by Francis Walker in 1870. It is found in Egypt and Saudi Arabia.

References

Crambini
Moths described in 1870
Moths of Africa
Moths of Asia